Loretz-d'Argenton is a commune in the Deux-Sèvres department in the Nouvelle-Aquitaine region in western France. It was established on 1 January 2019 by merger of the former communes of Argenton-l'Église (the seat) and Bouillé-Loretz.

See also
Communes of the Deux-Sèvres department

References

Communes of Deux-Sèvres